Pellaea brachyptera is a species of fern known by the common name Sierra cliffbrake. It is native to the coastal and inland mountains of northern California and Oregon, and a disjunct population was discovered in Chelan County, Washington, in 1986.

Description 
The fern grows in rocky cliffs and slopes of igneous origin.

Pellaea brachyptera grows from a branching reddish-brown rhizome several centimeters long. Each gray-green leaf is an elongated, narrow branch up to 40 centimeters long. It is composed of a straight dark brown rachis lined with leaflets which are each divided into pointed, leathery, almost needlelike linear segments. The edges of each segment are rolled under. The sporangia are located under the edges.

References

External links

Jepson Manual Treatment - Pellaea brachyptera
USDA Plants Profile; Pellaea brachyptera
Flora of North America
Pellaea brachyptera - Photo gallery

brachyptera
Ferns of California
Flora of the Sierra Nevada (United States)
Flora of Oregon
Flora of Washington (state)
Endemic flora of the United States